Vincent "Vinnie" Calabrese (born 7 October 1987) is a former Australian professional snooker player from Campbelltown, New South Wales. He was based in Cambridge together with his compatriot Neil Robertson, although he has since moved back to Australia.

Early career
Calabrese started playing snooker aged 7 and soon came to success, winning a number of local tournaments. At the age of just 16 he had already claimed the Australian Snooker Championship. Since 2006 he has been spending a lot of time in England, playing in the PIOS tournaments and practising with Neil Robertson. His initial attempts to gain the main tour place via PIOS and later Q School were unsuccessful, however in 2013 he captured the Oceania Championship in Papua New Guinea with a 6–5 victory against Matthew Bolton to earn a two-year card for the 2013–14 and 2014–15 seasons.

2013/2014 season
Thanks to the newly introduced flat draws, Calabrese was able to qualify for the venue stages of his debut tournament, the Wuxi Classic, as he defeated Anthony McGill 5–3. He lost 5–1 to John Higgins in the last 64 at the venue in China. At the UK Championship he led world number 22 Dominic Dale 5–2, but was pegged back to 5–5 with Calabrese saying afterwards that he couldn't hold himself together. However, in the deciding frame he made a composed 70 break to win 6–5 before losing 6–3 against Gary Wilson in the second round. Calabrese was knocked out of the first round of seven of the eight European Tour events, but at the Bluebell Wood Open he defeated world number two Mark Selby 4–2, Dechawat Poomjaeng 4–2 and David Morris 4–1 and then led Jimmy Robertson 3–0 in the last 16, but was beaten 4–3. He finished his debut season on the tour ranked world number 105.

2014/2015 season
Calabrese won just two matches during the 2014–15 season. In February 2015, Calabrese gave up his World Snooker Tour card after the Welsh Open, in which he lost 4–1 to Ronnie O'Sullivan in the first round, to return to being an amateur player so he could compete in the Oceania Championship. In March 2015, Calabrese won the Oceania Championship by defeating Matthew Bolton 6–3 in the final and earned a two-year tour card for the 2015–16 and 2016–17 seasons.

2015/2016 season
Calabrese won just two of 13 games during the 2015/2016 season. He was relegated from the professional tour at the end of season, although he had resigned his tour place a few months prior to this.

Performance and rankings timeline

Tournament wins

Amateur
 Oceania Championship – 2013, 2015

References

External links

Vinnie Calabrese at worldsnooker.com

1987 births
Living people
Australian snooker players
Sportspeople from Sydney